Haroyan is an Armenian surname. Notable people with the surname include:

 Lilit Haroyan (born 1990), Armenian actress
 Varazdat Haroyan (born 1992), Armenian football player

Armenian-language surnames